Mohammed "Mo" Mohandis (born 28 June 1985) is a Moroccan-Dutch politician. As a member of the Dutch Labour Party (Partij van de Arbeid) he was an MP between September 20, 2012 and March 23, 2017. He was a member of the municipal council of Gouda from 2006 to 2012.

Mohandis is a former chairperson of the Dutch Young Socialists. He studied communications management.

References

External links 
 

1985 births
Living people
Dutch people of Moroccan descent
Labour Party (Netherlands) politicians
Members of the House of Representatives (Netherlands)
Municipal councillors in South Holland
People from Gouda, South Holland
21st-century Dutch politicians